The Thunder Mustang is a modern 0.75 scale replica of the P-51 Mustang. It has joined the ranks of the high-performance P-51 kits alongside the Titan Aircraft T-51, which has a welded steel airframe with a secondary monocoque aluminum shell, the all-aluminum Stewart S-51D, and the full-scale, turbine-powered Cameron P-51G.

Design and development
The Thunder Mustang is currently in renewed production stages. Production ceased in the fall of 1999. The Thunder Builders Group LLC owned the assets required to manufacture the airplane in September 2010, when they sold the assets to Dean Holt of Mount Vernon, Washington. 
Dean is currently in the process of manufacturing all the necessary components for complete kit offerings, which will be available in late fall 2011.

Operational history
There were a total of 37 complete or partial kits produced, including the prototype. Of these 37, 27 were delivered as complete kits including the Falconer engine.  Two have Walter turbines installed and presently flying.

Four Thunder Mustangs have competed at the Reno Air Races. John Parker has recorded lap speeds of more than 355 mph on the racecourse using the normally aspirated Falconer engine in his Thunder Mustang Blue Thunder II. Parker perished in a landing incident at Reno Stead on May 1, 2018.  George Giboney posted lap speeds of 397 mph with his supercharged version of the Falconer engine during the 2010 races, with level flight top speed of more than 415 mph.

On January 4, 2020, a Thunder Mustang crashed in Santa Clarita, California, killing the pilot.

See also
Stewart S-51D Mustang
FK-Lightplanes SW51 Mustang
Titan T-51 Mustang
Jurca Gnatsum
W.A.R. P-51 Mustang
Loehle 5151 Mustang
Cameron P-51G

References

1990s United States sport aircraft
Homebuilt aircraft
Thunder Mustang
Single-engined tractor aircraft
Low-wing aircraft
North American P-51 Mustang replicas